This is a list of flags that are used exclusively in Pays de la Loire. Other flags used in Pays de la Loire, as well as the rest of France can be found at list of French flags.

Regional flags

Departmental flags

City and town flags

Traditional districts

Notes
 Registered at the French Society of Vexillology.

References

Pays de la Loire